Sternopygus is a genus of glass knifefishes found in tropical and subtropical South America (south to the Río de la Plata Basin), and Panama. They inhabit a wide range of freshwater habitats, from fast-flowing rivers to essentially static waters in floodplains, and shallow habitats to the bottom of deep rivers. S. macrurus will even visit brackish mangrove to feed.

They are medium to large knifefish, with a maximum total length of  depending on the exact species. They feed on invertebrates, small fish and fruits. Most members of Gymnotiformes are nocturnal, but Sternopygus are both nocturnal and diurnal.

Species
There are currently ten recognized species in this genus.

 Sternopygus aequilabiatus (Humboldt, 1805)
 Sternopygus arenatus (Eydoux & Souleyet, 1850)
 Sternopygus astrabes Mago-Leccia, 1994
 Sternopygus branco Crampton, Hulen & Albert, 2004
 Sternopygus dariensis Meek & Hildebrand 1916
 Sternopygus macrurus (Bloch & J. G. Schneider, 1801) (Longtail knifefish)
 Sternopygus obtusirostris Steindachner, 1881
 Sternopygus pejeraton L. P. Schultz, 1949
 Sternopygus sabaji Torgersen & Albert, 2022
 Sternopygus xingu Albert & W. L. Fink, 1996

References

Sternopygidae
Freshwater fish genera
Taxa named by Johannes Peter Müller
Taxa named by Franz Hermann Troschel